USS Darlington was a captured Confederate steamer acquired by the Union Navy from the prize court during the American Civil War. She was put into service by the Union Navy to patrol navigable waterways of the Confederacy to prevent the South from trading with other countries.

Captured steamer converted to Union Navy use 
 

East Coast operations 

She was taken over and, with a crew of 23 and one howitzer as armament, USS Darlington was employed by the Union Navy for use in the waters off Fernandina, Florida, and Port Royal, South Carolina, with Acting Master J. W. Godfrey in command.

Transfer to the Union Army 

She was transferred to the Union Army for use as a transport in September 1862.

See also 

 Ships captured in the American Civil War
 Union Navy
 Confederate States Navy
 List of schooners

References 

Ships of the Union Navy
Steamships of the United States Navy
Ships of the United States Army
Captured ships